Hüttensteinach is a former town in Thuringia, Germany. It has been absorbed by the larger town Sonneberg, and is now a suburb of that town.

Villages in Thuringia
Duchy of Saxe-Meiningen